is a railway station on the Iida Line in the city of Iida, Nagano Prefecture, Japan, operated by Central Japan Railway Company (JR Central).

Lines
Kinno Station is served by the Iida Line and is 113.6 kilometers from the starting point of the line at Toyohashi Station.

Station layout
The station consists of a single ground-level side platform serving one bi-directional track. There is no station building, but only a small rain shelter on the platform. The station is unattended.

Adjacent stations

History
Kinno Station opened on 30 October 1932. With the privatization of Japanese National Railways (JNR) on 1 April 1987, the station came under the control of JR Central.

Passenger statistics
In fiscal 2015, the station was used by an average of 1 passenger daily (boarding passengers only).

Surrounding area
The station is located in an isolated rural area near the Tenryū River.

See also
 List of railway stations in Japan

References

External links

 Kinno Station information 

Railway stations in Nagano Prefecture
Railway stations in Japan opened in 1932
Stations of Central Japan Railway Company
Iida Line
Iida, Nagano